Electronic compass can refer to:

 magnetometer (as in some hand-held GPS units)
 fibre optic gyrocompass (as in a ship's navigation system)